The LAK-17 is a Lithuanian single-seat sailplane that was designed at the Lithuanian Aero Club ( or LAK), and is manufactured by Sportinė Aviacija.

Design and development

The LAK-17 is designed to meet the requirements of the utility category of JAR-22. It is a single-seat mid-wing sailplane of composite construction with a T-tail and flaps, it has a retractable single-wheel main landing gear and has airbrakes on the upper wing surface. The airfoil is a combination of the LAP92-130/15, at its roots, and the LAP-92-150/15, at its tips. The LAK-17 holds water ballast in tanks in the wing and fin. The LAK-17A was certified in November 1994 by the Lithuanian Civil Aviation Authority. A new variant with an improved wing was designated the LAK-17B.

An optional front electric sustainer engine variant was developed for the LAK-17 by Slovenian engineers at LZ Design. It originally had a 0.9 metre propeller, and the latest versions have a 1.0 metre propeller in the nose driven by an electric motor.

Variants
LAK-17A
Production flapped 15- or 18-metre wingspan sailplane.
LAK-17AT
Powered self-sustaining sailplane variant of the LAK-17A with a Solo 2350 two-cylinder air-cooled two-stroke retractable engine.
LAK-17A FES
A LAK-17A with a front electric sustainer.
LAK-17B
Improved variant with new wing profile and modified geometry. 
LAK-17BT
Powered self-sustaining sailplane variant of the LAK-17B with a Solo 2350 retractable engine.
LAK-17B FES
A LAK-17B with a front electric sustainer.
LAK-17C FES
Improved variant with aerodynamic changes as well as a raised undercarriage to provide increased ground clearance for the folding propeller and increased battery capacity for self launching.

Specifications (LAK-17A with 15 metre wingspan)

References

External links

 

1990s Lithuanian sailplanes
Electric aircraft
LAK aircraft